Bar Aftab-e Ali Asgar (also Romanized as Bar Āftāb-e ʿAlī ʿAsgar; also known as Bar Āftāb-e Halākdar) is a village in Chamsangar Rural District, Papi District, Khorramabad County, Lorestan Province, Iran. At the 2006 census, its population was 255, in 50 families.

References 

Towns and villages in Khorramabad County